No Ache Island is an island in Dare County, North Carolina, in the United States.

According to one source, No Ache might have been intended as a soothing name for an inhospitable place.

References

 

Islands of Dare County, North Carolina
Outer Banks
Islands of North Carolina